Kotomi Takahata and Prarthana Thombare were the defending champions, however Takahata chose to participate in Kōfu, while Thombare chose to participate in Manchester.

Réka Luca Jani and Nadia Podoroska won the title after defeating Danka Kovinić and Nina Stojanović 6–4, 6–4 in the final.

Seeds

Draw

Draw

References
Main Draw

Hódmezővásárhely Ladies Open - Doubles